About 60% of Kentucky lies in the Eastern Time Zone, with the rest in the Central Time Zone, as follows:

Counties to the north and east of this boundary are in the Eastern Time Zone, while counties to the south and west are in the Central Time Zone. 30% of the area in Eastern Time Zone is further west than areas to the south. This progression to the west is further continued into Indiana.

IANA time zone database
In the IANA time zone database, Kentucky is covered by four time zones, columns marked " * " contain the data from the file zone.tab:

Notable clocks
The Floral Clock in Frankfort is a working clock that has a face planted with flowers, and is an attraction in its own right.
 The Colgate Clock in Clarksville, Indiana, is the second-largest timepiece in the world. It faces the Ohio River to its south, and is most typically viewed from across the river in Louisville.
It was first installed in 1976 and after several relocations and various mechanical problems, was dismantled in 2015.

See also
 Time in the United States

References

Kentucky
Geography of Kentucky